Jack and Jill is a 1917 American Western silent film directed by William Desmond Taylor and written by Gardner Hunting and Margaret Turnbull. The film stars Jack Pickford, Louise Huff, Leo Houck, Don Bailey, J.H. Holland, and Jack Hoxie. The film was released on November 12, 1917, by Paramount Pictures.

Plot
As described in a film magazine, Jack (Pickford), an East Side New York lightweight fighter, becomes the dupe in a frame-up fight in which he knocks out a champion and is led to believe that he killed the man. That night he goes to New Jersey and boards a handcar. The next day he finds himself in Texas where the cowboys decide to have a good time with the tenderfoot. Jill (Huff), his pal and sweetheart, gets the money due Jack for fighting and, when she hears from him, she, too, goes to Texas. She arrives at the ranch when the cowboys are away and the Mexicans are planning a raid. When Jack hears of her presence, he rushes to the ranch and arrives just in time to prevent the Mexicans from attacking it. He knocks out several Mexicans just as the cowboys, who were wondering why Jack was in such a hurry, arrive. The Mexicans are driven off and Jack is the hero of the hour. He is given a steady position at the ranch and he and Jill live on happily.

Cast

Preservation
With no prints of Jack and Jill located in any film archives, it is a lost film.

References

External links

 
 
 The AFI Catalog of Feature Films: Jack and Jill

1917 films
1910s English-language films
1917 Western (genre) films
Paramount Pictures films
Lost Western (genre) films
Films directed by William Desmond Taylor
American black-and-white films
Lost American films
1917 lost films
American boxing films
Silent American Western (genre) films
1910s American films